Dallamano is am Italian surname. Notable people with the surname include:

Giuseppe Dallamano (1679–1758), Italian painter 
Massimo Dallamano (1917–1976), Italian director and director of photography
Simone Dallamano (born 1983), Italian footballer 

Italian-language surnames